Southern Highland Craft Guild is a guild craft organization that has partnered with the National Park Service for over seventy years. The Guild represents over 800 craftspeople in 293 counties of 9 southeastern states. It operates four retail craft shops and two annual craft expositions which represents the Guild members' work. These expositions occur in July and October and have taken place in the Appalachian mountain region since 1948.

Headquarters 

The Southern Highland Craft Guild is headquartered at the Folk Art Center at milepost 382 
of the Blue Ridge Parkway in Asheville, North Carolina.  There is an extensive Arts and Crafts research public library available for anyone to use. The Folk Art Center also houses the Guild's century-old Allanstand Craft Shop, three galleries of exhibitions, and a large auditorium.

The Folk Art Center admission is free. It is open daily 10am-5pm except Thanksgiving, Christmas and New Year's Day. It houses the Eastern National Bookstore and Information Center. Visitors can often observe craftspeople at work in craft demonstrations as well as a series of educational events held year-round. The Guild crafts are seen by about a quarter of a million visitors each year.

History 

The Guild was actually the brain-child of Olive Dame Campbell, founder of the John C. Campbell Folk School.  She and other founding members met through the Southern Mountain Workers Conference which was held in Knoxville beginning in 1900. At the Southern Mountain Workers Conference of 1926 Olive Campbell suggested forming an actual official crafts organization. This was followed by planning meetings in 1928 and 1929 at which founding members decided the goals and by-laws of the Guild at the Spinning Wheel in Asheville, North Carolina.

They then came up with the name of Southern Mountain Handicraft Guild. The organization was chartered in 1930 as the Southern Mountain Handicraft Guild and in 1933 changed its name to the Southern Highland Handicraft Guild. The name changed again in the 1990s where the word "Handicraft" was changed to just "Craft".

During the Great Depression and in the 1930s the Guild cultivated commerce for craftspeople in the Appalachian region. Educational programming is another fundamental element of the organization's mission. The Guild began work with the National Park Service in 1942 when they opened a shop on the Skyline Drive in Virginia.  Unfortunately, World War II gasoline rationing ended that for the duration.  Various other venues such as Great Smoky Mountains National Park, and Mammoth Cave National Park did not work out.

In the 1940s TVA work led to the formation of the Southern Highlanders, a craft marketing organization which was government sponsored and had shops at the Norris Dam in Tennessee and the Rockefeller Center in New York City.  Because of the broad over-lap in region and purpose, Southern Highlanders merged with the Craft Guild in 1951. This same year the Parkway Craft Center that is run by the  Southern Highland Craft Guild opened at the Moses Cone Manor house.
 
Frances L. Goodrich was a founding member of the guild organization. She came to the Asheville region in 1890 to do educational and organizational work as a volunteer for the Presbyterian Home Mission Board. The idea of being involved in the arts and crafts field was an inspiration for her in the form of an antique bedspread. She had a background in art and knew about the Arts and Crafts movement from years of living in Europe.  She seized the opportunity to create a crafts market, because the coverlet gift brought home the fact that craft work was still being done in the mountains.

The founding members also launched the library, which today is a collection of 9,000 books and materials on craft, craft history, international and regional craftwork, and other art and regional materials.
 
Since 1980 the library has operated out of the Folk Art Center in Asheville on the Blue Ridge Parkway as its permanent home. The guild is the second oldest craft organization in the United States behind the Boston Society of Arts and Crafts.

Collections 

The Guild holds one of the largest collections of Appalachian Craft in the world with its exhibit featuring traditional woodcarving, textiles, furniture, basketry, pottery, dolls, and other crafts.

The Guild's Permanent Collection consists of over 5,000 items, which date back to the original gift from Goodrich, who gave the Guild her collection of "the best in mountain handicrafts."  Only 200 objects are on display in the gallery at any one time.

The Southern Highland Craft Guild Collection of the guild organization represents approximately 200 historical craft works of southern Appalachia dating from 1855 to objects of the modern craft movement.

Many of the pieces date from the 19th century and were collected by Goodrich. Goodrich was 74 when the Guild was actually founded and so while she was involved, her main contribution was in deeding her Allanstand Cottage Industries sales outlets to the new Guild.

Membership 

Membership in the organization is strictly of those that represent John C. Campbell's definition of Appalachia. The active members come from a nine-state region that includes counties within the Appalachian mountain area of Kentucky, Tennessee, Virginia, West Virginia, North Carolina, South Carolina, Georgia, Maryland, and Alabama. Membership in the organization is restricted to the counties identified as "The Southern Highland Region" by John C. Campbell.

These craftspeople produce both traditional and contemporary objects. It is also regarded as an achievement in one's chosen craft because of the strict standard requirements. To become a member of the Southern Highland Craft Guild craftspeople must pass a rigorous jury process. Craftspeople may apply to become a member in a specified media category of; clay, fiber, glass, manmade materials, metal, mixed media, natural materials, paper, wood, and jewelry. The initial phase of standards jury procedure includes a written application and the preliminary screening of the applicant's work through the presentation of five slides. Part two is the object jury when members of the Standards Committee together with a panel of media specialists evaluate each applicants work. Only about 10% of applicants are accepted.

The Craft Fair 
The Craft Fair produced by the Southern Highland Craft Guild started in 1948 and seven decades later is a tradition. More than two hundred craftspeople fill two floors of Harrah's Cherokee Center - Asheville twice each year in July and October. Local musicians play live on the arena stage; craft educators share their knowledge with adults and children alike through demonstrations and hands-on projects. Eleven thousand visitors from all over the country participate in festivities during the four days of the show. Over the course of the event, nearly a million dollars are invested in the purchase of crafts.

The Shops 
Allanstand Craft Shop was started by Presbyterian missionary Frances Goodrich in 1895. Ms. Goodrich bestowed ownership of the shop to the Southern Highland Handicraft Guild in 1931, the year after the Guild was formed, for the purpose of allowing the fledgling organization to have a strong financial base from which to carry out its mission. Located in downtown Asheville, North Carolina, from 1917 until it moved to the Blue Ridge Parkway's Folk Art Center in 1980, Allanstand Craft Shop has been recognized as one of the nation's top craft shops with arts and crafts made by members of the Southern Highland Craft Guild. The shop continues to offer for sale an array of work from traditional mountain crafts and folk art to the latest in contemporary American craft.

Guild Crafts 
Guild Crafts is located at 930 Tunnel Rd. in Asheville, North Carolina. They are a pair of stone houses built in the 1940s by Ralph Morris Senior for Stuart Nye Jewelry and the Southern Highland Craft Guild. Guild Crafts continues as a craft shop offering handmade crafts of jewelry, pottery, baskets, ironwork, glass, and fiber. Seasonal live craft demonstrations and daily tours of the Stuart Nye workshop are available free of charge to the public.

Folk Art Center 
During the construction of the Blue Ridge Parkway in Asheville, North Carolina, a cooperative relationship formed between the National Park Service and the Southern Highland Craft Guild. Together with the Appalachian Regional Commission, the Folk Art Center was built. Today, it holds a craft shop, library, three exhibition spaces, an auditorium for special events, and a National Park Service bookstore and information desk. The Folk Art Center is home to one of the oldest craft organizations in the America: The Southern Highland Craft Guild, est. in 1930.

Parkway Craft Center 
The Parkway Craft Center, which is operated by the Southern Highland Craft Guild, opened at Moses Cone Manor in Blowing Rock, North Carolina in 1951.

Biltmore Village 
The newest edition of the Southern Highland Craft Guild; formerly the 1928 Biltmore-Oteen Bank, this Art Deco building is now home to the works of nearly 200 regional artisans.

Footnote references

External links 
 Southern Highland Craft Guild website
The 74th Annual Craft Fair of the Southern Highlands
Inventory of the Southern Highland Craft Guild Collection 1993-95
Craft Revival Project of the Hunter Library at Western Carolina University

Southern art
Decorative arts
Cultural organizations based in North Carolina
Companies based in Asheville, North Carolina
1948 establishments in North Carolina
Organizations established in 1948